Vicary House may refer to:
 Vicary House (Canton, Ohio), listed on the NRHP in Stark County, Ohio
 Captain William Vicary House, listed on the NRHP in Beaver County, Pennsylvania

See also
 Vicarage, or clergy house